Monodilepas otagoensis is a species of small sea snail, a keyhole limpet, a subspecies of marine gastropod mollusc in the family Fissurellidae, the keyhole limpets and slit limpets.

This species has only been found in New Zealand.

Description 
Monodilepas otagoensis was originally discovered and described by Harold John Finlay in 1930.

References

Fissurellidae
Gastropods described in 1930
Taxa named by Harold John Finlay